Bothrops barnetti, also known commonly as Barnett's lancehead and Barnett's pit viper, is a species of venomous snake, a pit viper in the subfamily Crotalinae of the family Viperidae. The species is endemic to Peru. There are no subspecies that are recognized as being valid.

Etymology
The specific name, barnetti, is in honor of Burgess Barnett (1888–1944), who collected the holotype and paratypes. Dr. Barnett was Curator of Reptiles at the London Zoo (1932–1937) and Superintendent of the Rangoon Zoological Gardens (1938–1944).

Description
B. barnetti is patterned in white and black triangles. Males usually grow to 120 cm (47 inches) in total length (including tail), whereas females are quite smaller and thinner. The body is heavily shaped and stocky.

Common names
English common names for B. barnetti are Barnett's lancehead  and Barnett's pit viper. In Peru it is referred to as cascabel, cascabel falso, macanche, sancarranca, and zancarranca.

Geographic range
B. barnetti is found along the Pacific coast of northern Peru. It occurs at low elevations in arid, tropical scrub.

The type locality given is "from the mouths of Quebradas Honda and Perines, between Lobitos and Talara, northern Peru".

Reproduction
B. barnetti is viviparous.

References

Further reading
Freiberg M (1982). Snakes of South America. Hong Kong: T.F.H. Publications. 189 pp. . (Bothrops barnetti, p. 119).
Parker HW (1938). "The vertical distribution of some reptiles and amphibians from southern Ecuador". Ann. Mag. Nat. Hist., Series 11, 2: 438–450. (Bothrops barnetti, new species, p. 447).
Schmidt KP, Walker WF (1943). "Snakes of the Peruvian Coastal Region". Zoological Series of the Field Museum of Natural History 24 (27): 297–324. (Trimeresurus barnetti, new combination, p. 322).
Silva W (2012). "Haltung und Zucht der Sancarranca (Bothrops barnetti)" Ophidia 6 (1): 8–25.

barnetti
Taxa named by Hampton Wildman Parker
Reptiles described in 1938